Iga Świątek defeated Sofia Kenin in the final, 6–4, 6–1 to win the women's singles tennis title at the 2020 French Open.

It was Świątek's first major title and first WTA Tour singles title overall, making her the first player since Jeļena Ostapenko to win a major tournament as their first singles title. Ranked as the world No. 54, Świątek became the lowest-ranked player to win the title since rankings were introduced in 1975, and the lowest-ranked player to win any major since Sloane Stephens won the 2017 US Open. Świątek also became the first Pole to win a major singles title. At 19 years and 4 months of age, she became the youngest woman to win the title since Monica Seles in 1992. Świątek did not drop a set throughout the entire tournament, dropping only 28 games in total, the fewest since Steffi Graf dropped 20 games in 1988. This also marked the first French Open where both the men's and women's singles champions did not drop a set during the tournament. Świątek became the first Polish woman since Jadwiga Jędrzejowska in 1939 to reach a French Open final, and the first to reach any major final since Agnieszka Radwańska at the 2012 Wimbledon Championships.

Ashleigh Barty was the reigning champion, but chose not to participate due to safety concerns resulting from the ongoing COVID-19 pandemic. This marked the first time since 2008 that the reigning champion did not attempt to defend her title.

Barty and Simona Halep were in contention for the WTA No. 1 singles ranking. Barty retained the top ranking when Halep lost to Świątek in the fourth round, ensuring a year-end No. 1 ranking for the second consecutive year. Halep's loss guaranteed a new French Open champion for the fifth consecutive year, and a maiden major finalist from the top half of the draw.

Serena Williams was attempting to equal Margaret Court's all-time record of 24 major singles titles, but withdrew before her second round match due to a pre-existing left Achilles injury.

This was the final major in which the reigning Olympic gold medalist Monica Puig appeared in the main draw; she lost to Sara Errani in the first round.

This was the first major since the 1999 Wimbledon Championships where two qualifiers, Nadia Podoroska and Martina Trevisan, reached the quarterfinals. Podoroska became the first qualifier in history to reach the semifinals of the French Open and the first to reach the semifinals at any major since Alexandra Stevenson at the 1999 Wimbledon Championships. She also became the first Argentine woman since Gabriela Sabatini at the 1995 US Open to reach the semifinals of a singles major, and the lowest-ranked semifinalist (ranked No. 130) at any major since Justine Henin at the 2010 Australian Open.

Seeds
Seeding per WTA rankings.

Draw

Finals

Top half

Section 1

Section 2

Section 3

Section 4

Bottom half

Section 5

Section 6

Section 7

Section 8

Championship match statistics

Other entry information

Wild cards

Protected ranking

Qualifiers

Lucky loser
  Astra Sharma

Withdrawals
Before the tournament

During the tournament
  Serena Williams (achilles injury)
  Alison Van Uytvanck
  Camila Giorgi

References

External links 
2020 French Open – Women's draws and results at the International Tennis Federation

Women's Singles
French Open by year – Women's singles
French Open - Women's Singles